Gustav Thöni (sometimes listed as Gustavo Thoeni; born 28 February 1951) is an Italian retired alpine ski racer.

Career
Thöni was born in the German-speaking province of South Tyrol, in the hamlet of Trafoi of the Stilfs municipality, which is situated on the northern ramp of the Stelvio Pass. He currently operates a hotel there.

Ranked among the greatest Italian skiers ever, Thöni won three Olympic medals and a total of four overall World Cup titles in five years in the early 1970s. The four titles are an achievement he shares with Pirmin Zurbriggen and Hermann Maier, exceeded by Marcel Hirscher's eight and Marc Girardelli's five.

Thöni was the dominant skier in the technical events (slalom and giant slalom) in the early 1970s. At Val d'Isère, on December 12, 1968, was his World Cup debut. The 17-year-old placed 40th in the giant slalom (bib 110). His first victory came in the first race of the next season, a giant slalom at Val d'Isère, France, in December 1969. Still a teenager, he had a very successful rookie year during that 1970 season with four victories and nine podiums.  He finished third in the overall standings, just eight points behind winner Karl Schranz of Austria. Thöni won the overall title the next three seasons of 1971–73, and again in 1975. He was succeeded as the dominant technical skier by Ingemar Stenmark of Sweden, then by Alberto Tomba.

The year that Thöni did not win (1974), he was a close second to his fellow countryman and friend Piero Gros. He did win two world titles that year, in giant slalom and slalom,  at the 1974 World Championships, but those results were not included in the World Cup standings.

Although he concentrated on the technical events, he did occasionally compete in the only speed event of the era, the downhill (the Super-G was not run on the World Cup circuit until December 1982). His best finish in a downhill was a second place on the Hahnenkamm, Kitzbühel, Austria, in January 1975. This event inspired the 1981 movie Un centesimo di secondo by Duccio Tessari, which featured Thöni himself.

Thöni also won a number of combined events (downhill & slalom) during his career, including the non-medal titles in the combined at the Olympics in 1972 and 1976 (but counted as world championship titles).

Thöni's final victory in a slalom came in March 1975 at Sun Valley. He won the final race of the season, a parallel slalom ("pro-style" heats) the following week in Val Gardena, Italy, against his challenger Stenmark to secure the overall title. His last win in giant slalom was in January 1976, and his final World Cup victory was in the combined at Kitzbühel in January 1977. His last podium finish was a third place in the slalom at Åre, Sweden, in February 1979.

He finished eighth in the slalom at the 1980 Winter Olympics at Lake Placid. As the torch had been passed on to the two top finishers, Stenmark and American Phil Mahre, Thöni retired from World Cup competition a month later in March 1980 at the age of 29. Later, he was a personal coach to Alberto Tomba (1989–1996). In parallel, he was technical director of the men's national team, and then, until 1999, general manager of both male and female national teams.

Thöni was the Italian flag bearer at the opening ceremonies of the 1976 and 1980 Olympics and at the closing of the 2006 Winter Games in Torino. In 1973 and 1974 he was named "Skieur d’Or" by international ski journalists. He is mentioned in the song "Nuntereggae più" by Rino Gaetano. His cousin Roland Thöni was also a World Cup alpine ski racer in the 1970s. Roland took bronze in the slalom at the 1972 Olympics, while Gustav took the silver.

World Cup results

Season titles
 8 titles (4 overall, 2 giant slalom, 2 slalom)

Season standings

Race victories
 24 wins (11 GS, 8 SL, 4K, 1 PR)
 69 podiums (2 DH, 26 GS, 32 SL, 8 K, 1 PR)
 25 second places
 20 third places
 World Cup races (over 300 starts)

World championship results 

From 1948 through 1980, the Winter Olympics were also the World Championships for alpine skiing.
At the World Championships from 1954 through 1980, the combined was a "paper race" using the results of the three events (DH, GS, SL).

Olympic results

See also
 Italian men gold medalist at the Olympics and World Championships
 Italy national alpine ski at the World championships
 Italian skiers most successful race winner

Video

References

External links
 
 
 Gustav Thöni at Bella-Vista.it

1951 births
Living people
People from Stilfs
Italian male alpine skiers
Olympic alpine skiers of Italy
Alpine skiers at the 1972 Winter Olympics
Alpine skiers at the 1976 Winter Olympics
Alpine skiers at the 1980 Winter Olympics
Germanophone Italian people
Olympic gold medalists for Italy
Olympic silver medalists for Italy
Olympic medalists in alpine skiing
FIS Alpine Ski World Cup champions
Alpine skiers of Fiamme Gialle
Medalists at the 1976 Winter Olympics
Medalists at the 1972 Winter Olympics
Sportspeople from Südtirol
Italian alpine skiing coaches